The 2021 FC Kairat season was the 11th successive season that the club played in the Kazakhstan Premier League, the highest tier of association football in Kazakhstan, since their promotion back to the top flight in 2009. Kairat were defending Premier League Champions, and finished the season in Third place this time round. In the domestic cups, Kairat finished Third in the Super Cup and won the Kazakhstan Cup. In Europe, Kairat were knocked out of the UEFA Champions League in the Second qualifying round, the Europa League in the Third qualifying round and the Europa Conference League at the end of the Group Stage.

Season events
On 19 January, Kairat announced the signing of Streli Mamba from SC Paderborn on a contract until 31 December 2022.

On 10 March, Kairat announced the signing of José Kanté from Legia Warsaw on a contract until 31 December 2022.

On 11 March, Kairat announced that they had extended the contract of Yerkebulan Seydakhmet until the summer of 2022, with the option of an additional year.

On 7 June, Head Coach Aleksey Shpilevsky left Kairat to join Erzgebirge Aue, with Kirill Keker being placed in temporary charge.

On 17 June, Kirill Kolesnichenko left Kairat to sign permanently for Ural Yekaterinburg.

On 6 July, Kairat announced the signing of João Paulo from Ordabasy on an 18-month contract.

On 11 July, Kairat announced the signing of Macky Bagnack on a contract until December 2023, from Partizan. Two days later, 13 July, Kairat announced the signing of Ricardo Alves on a contract until December 2022, from Krylia Sovetov.

On 24 August, Kurban Berdyev was appointed as Head Coach of Kairat, on a contract until the end of the year, with an option to extend it for an additional two-years.

Squad

Out on loan

Transfers

In

Out

Loans out

Released

Friendlies

Competitions

Overview

Super Cup

Premier League

Results summary

Results by round

League table

Results

Kazakhstan Cup

Group stage

Knockout stages

Final

UEFA Champions League

Qualifying rounds

UEFA Europa League

Qualifying rounds

UEFA Europa Conference League

Qualifying rounds

Group stage

Squad statistics

Appearances and goals

|-
|colspan="14"|Players away from Kairat on loan:

|-
|colspan="14"|Players who left Kairat during the season:

|}

Goal scorers

Clean sheets

Disciplinary record

References

External links
Official Website

FC Kairat seasons
Kairat
Kairat
2021–22 UEFA Europa League participants seasons
2021–22 UEFA Europa Conference League participants seasons